The men's 15 kilometre cross-country race at the 1956 Winter Olympics was held on 30 January. Sixty-one competitors from twenty countries participated in the event. The Nordic countries of Norway and Sweden took first and second in the form of Hallgeir Brenden of Norway and Sixten Jernberg of Sweden. This was Jernberg's second silver medal of the Games. Soviet skier Pavel Kolchin won his second bronze of the Games.

Medalists

Source:

Results

* - Difference is in minutes and seconds.

Source:

See also

 1956 Winter Olympics

Notes

References
 

Men's cross-country skiing at the 1956 Winter Olympics
Men's 15 kilometre cross-country skiing at the Winter Olympics